United Paramount may refer to:

 United Paramount Network
 United Paramount Theatres, Inc. later American Broadcasting-Paramount Theatres, American Broadcasting Companies, Inc. then ABC Television, Inc.